Ratnapitha is an area between river Karatoya and Sonkosh and one of the four Pithas or geographical divisions of ancient Kamrup.

See also
 Kamarupa

References

Kamarupa (former kingdom)